Janet Murphy (born April 22, 1965) is a Canadian curler. She was born in Amherst, Nova Scotia but resides in Mississauga, Ontario. She is the director of curling at Mississaugua Golf & Country Club.

Career
From 2010–2014, Murphy was the third on Cathy Auld's team. From 2014-2015 she was the third on Clancy Grandy's team. 

From 2015–2018 she was third on Jacqueline Harrison's team. In 2015, the team won the Gord Carroll Curling Classic, Oakville Fall Classic and Royal LePage Women's Fall Classic. The following year, the team won the Brantford Nissan Classic.

She coached her daughter Jestyn Murphy who is also a curler. From 2018–2020 they both played on the same team with Janet being third and her daughter being the skip. The team went on to win the Listowel Women's Classic in 2018 and finished as runners-up the following year.

Personal life
Her husband Hugh Murphy was also a curler and died in 2020. They had two children, Jestyn and Hale. Murphy works as the director of curling at the Mississaugua Golf & Country Club.

References

Living people
Canadian women curlers
1965 births
Curlers from Nova Scotia
People from Amherst, Nova Scotia
Curlers from Ontario
Sportspeople from Mississauga 
Canadian curling coaches